Bogale Township is a township of Pyapon District in the Ayeyarwady Region of Burma (Myanmar).

In May 2008, the town of Bogale suffered heavily from Cyclone Nargis; 36,325 people were listed as dead or missing.

Communities
On 8 August 2008, two village tracts (Kadonkani and Ayeyar) from Pyapon Township
were moved into Bogale Township. , there were 71 village tracts comprising 589 villages in Bogale Township. Additional boundary adjustments were made on 5 August 2009.

Notes

External links
 "Bogale Township, Ayeyarwady Division" map ID: MIMU154v02, created: 1 July 2010, Myanmar Information Management Unit (MIMU)
 "Bogale Google Satellite Map" Maplandia World Gazetteer

Townships of Ayeyarwady Region